Komeil Ghasemi (born 27 February 1988) is a retired Iranian wrestler who won a gold medal in the men's freestyle 120 kg event at the 2012 Summer Olympics. Ghasemi was awarded his Olympic gold medal after the two wrestlers ahead of him failed drug tests. Ghasemi is the most successful Iranian heavyweight wrestler at the Olympic Games.

He also won a silver medal at the 2011 Asian Wrestling Championships in the 120 kg freestyle discipline. He was born in Juybar, in Iran's Mazandaran province but spent his childhood in Sari. He started wrestling seriously after moving back to Juybar. Following his Olympic appearance, Ghasemi won the 120 kg weight class at the 2013 Freestyle World Cup in Tehran, Iran, helping his nation take gold in the tournament. At the 2014 Asian Wrestling Championships he won a gold medal in the 125 kg freestyle tournament, while at that year's World Championships he took silver in the same event. He took silver in the 125 kg freestyle event at the 2015 Asian Wrestling Championships, losing the final to Aiaal Lazarev of Kyrgyzstan, and the 2016 Summer Olympics, behind Taha Akgül of Turkey. Ghasemi retired in 2019 after losing the Iranian trials for the 2019 World Wrestling Championships.

Coaching career

He is currently the head coach of Cambodian national wrestling team, he started his coaching position in October 2020.

Under Ghasemi Cambodian wrestlers recorded a total haul of 19 medals (three golds, three silvers and 13 bronzes) at the 2022 Southeast Asian Wrestling Championship, their biggest ever since first joining the regional tournament a few years back.

References

External links
Komeil Ghasemi at United World Wrestling
Komeil Ghasemi on instagram

1988 births
Living people
Iranian male sport wrestlers
Olympic wrestlers of Iran
Olympic gold medalists for Iran
Olympic medalists in wrestling
Wrestlers at the 2012 Summer Olympics
Wrestlers at the 2016 Summer Olympics
Medalists at the 2012 Summer Olympics
Medalists at the 2016 Summer Olympics
People from Juybar
World Wrestling Championships medalists
Olympic silver medalists for Iran
Asian Wrestling Championships medalists
Sportspeople from Mazandaran province
20th-century Iranian people
21st-century Iranian people